Angle Vale Bridge is a laminated timber deck arch bridge erected in 1876 over the Gawler River on Heaslip Road, Angle Vale, South Australia. It is the only surviving bridge of its type in Australia. The bridge was listed on the South Australian Heritage Register on 24 July 1980.

Description

The bridge was opened by the on Wednesday 22 November 1876 by Commissioner of Public Works Hon. J. Colton with Miss Heaslip taking the honour of cutting the ribbon.

History

Laminated timber arch bridges were constructed in Australia on British and American designs from 1853. However, few survived due to the poor preservation of Australian timbers The first bridges of this type in South Australia were built in 1856 using both imported softwood and local hardwood and incorporated horizontally laminated bent timbers bolted at regular intervals. However the arches only had a service life of only 12 to 16 years due to water penetrating between the laminations causing the timber to quickly rot. An improvement was made by laminating the timbers vertically and capping the tops to prevent water ingress.

Tenders were called for erecting the Angle Vale Bridge on Wednesday 2 February 1876 closing on 21 February. The bridge was designed by Charles Francis Godfrey Ashwin C.E., Superintending Surveyor of the Northern District of the South Australia Central Road Board. the construction contract was won by Messrs Hack and Parker, while J.C. Brodie was the Clerk of Works. The bridge was completed in less than nine months and opened on Wednesday 22 November 1876. 
Ashwin was born in 1816 and appointed draftsman to the Central Road Board in 1855. He was promoted as Surveyor (engineer) on 11 March 1861. He died while returning to England on 29 April 1878.

The bridge was bypassed in 1966, and deteriorated before an extensive restoration program was carried out in 1988.

In 2008, its engineering heritage was recognized by the installation of a marker provided by the Engineers Australia's Engineering Heritage Recognition Program.

Comparisons

Only two other early laminated timber arch bridges are known in Australia, the 1873 Old Currency Creek Road Bridge off Goolwa - Strathalbyn Road which has been modified by the installation of riveted iron girders, and the 1863 Sunnyhill Bridge, which was inundated by the flooding of Millbrook Reservoir.

References

Road bridges in South Australia
Bridges completed in 1876
1876 establishments in Australia
Deck arch bridges
South Australian Heritage Register
Recipients of Engineers Australia engineering heritage markers
South Australian places listed on the defunct Register of the National Estate